The Combin de Boveire is a mountain of the Pennine Alps, located in the Grand Combin massif in Valais. It lies between the Boveire Glacier and the Corbassière Glacier.

References

External links
 Combin de Boveire on Hikr

Mountains of the Alps
Alpine three-thousanders
Mountains of Switzerland
Mountains of Valais